Plaice is the common name of four species of flatfishes.

Plaice or PLAICE may also refer to:

 USS Plaice (SS-390), a Balao-class submarine
 PLAICE, an open source hardware FLASH programmer, memory emulator, and logic analyzer
 Plaice Island
 Stephen Plaice (born 1951)

See also
 
 
 Place (disambiguation)
 Plac (disambiguation)